Ammodendron is a genus of flowering plants, called the sand acacias, in the family Fabaceae. It belongs to the subfamily Faboideae. Its name is derived from the Greek άμμος ammos ("sand") and δένδρον dendron ("tree").

Species
Ammodendron comprises the following species:

 Ammodendron bifolium (Pall.) Yakovlev
 Ammodendron conollyi Boiss.

 Ammodendron eichwaldii Ledeb.

 Ammodendron karelinii Fisch. & C.A. Mey.

 Ammodendron maxima (Fernald) A. Heller

Species names with uncertain taxonomic status
The status of the following species is unresolved:
 Ammodendron caspium Eichw.
 Ammodendron karelini Bunge
 Ammodendron lehmanni Bunge ex Boiss.
 Ammodendron persicum Bunge ex Boiss.
 Ammodendron zablotskii Fischer & Mey. ex Kar.

References

External links

Sophoreae
Fabaceae genera